Chhatrapati Shivaji Maharaj International Airport  is an international airport serving Mumbai and the Mumbai Metropolitan Region (MMR). It is the second busiest airport in the country in terms of total and international passenger traffic after Delhi, and was the 14th busiest airport in Asia and 41st busiest airport in the world by passenger traffic in calendar year 2019. Its passenger traffic was about 49.8 million in year 2018. 
It is also the second busiest airport in terms of cargo traffic. In March 2017, the airport surpassed London's Gatwick Airport as the world's busiest to operate a single runway at a time. This was later surpassed again by Gatwick Airport at the end of 2019 due to passenger numbers falling at Mumbai. The airport's IATA code BOM is associated with "Bombay", the city's former legal name.

It handled a record of 1,007 aircraft movements on 9 December 2018, higher than its earlier record of 1,003 flight movements in a day in June 2018. It handled a record of 51 movements in one hour on 16 September 2014. In financial year 2020, the Mumbai Airport handled 45.87 million passengers, only second to IGI's 67.3 million in India.

The airport is operated by Mumbai International Airport Limited (MIAL), a Joint Venture between the Airports Authority of India and the GVK Industries Ltd led consortium which was appointed in February 2006 to carry out the modernisation of the Airport. The new integrated terminal T2 was inaugurated on 10 January 2014 and opened for international operations on 12 February 2014. A dedicated six lane, elevated road connecting the new terminal with the main arterial Western Express Highway was also opened to the public the same day. Chhatrapati Shivaji airport offers nonstop or connecting flights to all six inhabited continents.

The airport is named after Chhatrapati Shivaji Maharaj (1630–1680), a 17th-century Chhatrapati of the Maratha Empire. It was renamed in 1999 from the previous "Sahar Airport" to "Chhatrapati Shivaji International Airport" (the title "Maharaj" was inserted on 30 August 2018). It is situated across the suburbs of Santacruz and Sahar Village in Vile Parle East.

History

RAF Santacruz was constructed in the 1930s. It was a bigger airfield than nearby Juhu Aerodrome and was home to several RAF squadrons during World War II from 1942 to 1947. The apron existed on the south side of runway 09/27, and the area, referred to today as the "Old Airport", houses, among others, maintenance hangars of Air India, Air Works India, Indamer Aviation Pvt Ltd, and MIAL's General Aviation Terminal.

By 1946, when the RAF began the process of handing over the airfield to the Director General of Civil Aviation for Civil operations, two old abandoned hangars of the Royal Air Force had been converted into a terminal for passenger traffic. One hangar was used as a domestic terminal and the other for international traffic. It had counters for customs and immigration checks on either side and a lounge in the center. Air India handled its passengers in its own terminal adjoining the two hangars. In its first year, it handled six civilian services a day.

Traffic at the airport increased after Karachi was partitioned to Pakistan and as many as 40 daily domestic and foreign services operated by 1949, prompting the Indian Government to develop the airport, equipping the airport with a night landing system comprising a Radio range and a modernised flare path lighting system Construction of a new passenger terminal and apron began in 1950 and was commissioned in 1958. Named after the neighbourhood in which it stood and initially under the aegis of the Public Works Department, the new airport was subsequently run by the Ministry of Civil Aviation.

With the dawning of the jumbo jet era in the 1970s, Santacruz, despite several extensions, began suffering from insufficient operational capacity.
The Santacruz terminal was designed to accommodate 600 passengers at any given time, but by the late 1970s, it was handling 1,200. In 1979–80, 5 million domestic and international passengers flew into and out of Santa Cruz compared with 3 million at Delhi's Palam Airport. The airlines were constantly expanding their services but there was no corresponding increase in space at the terminal, making it the most congested airport in the country. In one of its issues, Time magazine, referring to the chaos, called the terminal building a "black hole".
A major fire gutted the International section of the terminal building on 21 September 1979, killing three passengers and shutting down the airport. A temporary departure extension or "Gulf Terminal" was made functional in October that year until the terminal was repaired.

The Tata committee, set up in 1967 to examine the issues concerning the airport, had recommended the construction of a new international terminal to meet the requirements of traffic in the seventies. The Santa Cruz terminal was to be used for domestic traffic alone. The International Airport Authority of India (IAAI), which was set up in 1972, started planning the construction of a new terminal building for handling international passenger traffic, to be completed by 1981. Accordingly, construction of the new international terminal at Sahar to the northeast of Santacruz in Vile Parle was taken up at an estimated cost of  110 million.
Construction of the new international terminal at Sahar began in November 1977, and the first phase took three years to build. Sahar Terminal 2A, the first phase of the three-part terminal, was opened on 5 December 1980.

AAI had been considering the modernization of Bombay Airport in 1996 although the AAI board approved a modernisation proposal only in 2003. By then, Bombay and Delhi Airports were handling 38% of the country's aircraft movement and generating one-third of all revenues earned by AAI. At that time, the Bombay airport handled 13.3 million passengers, 60% of which were domestic travellers. The airport faced severe congestion for both aircraft and passengers as it was handling twice as many aircraft movements per day than it was originally designed for. The bidding process for its modernisation eventually began in May 2004 with the decision by the Empowered Group of Ministers (EGoM) was announced in January 2006. In November 2006, Delta Air Lines inaugurated a direct flight from Mumbai to New York's JFK Airport aboard a Boeing 777.

Ownership
A consortium of GVK Industries Ltd, Airports Company South Africa, and Bidvest, won the bid to manage and operate CSMIA. To accomplish this task, Mumbai International Airport Private Limited (MIAL), a joint venture between the consortium (74%) and the Airports Authority of India (26%) was formed. Since then, MIAL has made several improvements in the aesthetics, design and passenger conveniences at CSIA including the refurbishment of domestic terminals 1A & 1B, international terminals 2B & 2C, and the opening of a brand new domestic terminal 1C and new Terminal T2. MIAL also undertook airside improvement projects such as the commissioning of new taxiways, aprons and the reconstruction of both runways. In February 2008, MIAL entered into an agreement with Air Transport IT specialist SITA that led to CSIA becoming the first airport in India to Implement Common-use self-service Kiosks and CUTE (Common Use Terminal Equipment) check-in systems.

In February 2021, the Adani Group acquired both GVK and Bidvest's stakes in MIAL, giving it a controlling interest of 74% in the venture.

Structure

Runways
The airport has two intersecting runways and it handles an average of 980 flights per day. The runways have been upgraded to Code F, which means they can accommodate larger aircraft like the Airbus A380. Following a presentation in March 2011 by UK's air traffic service provider NATS on how the capacity of the airport can be increased, MIAL set a target of 48 aircraft movements an hour in an effort to reduce congestion at the airport. Both runways were operated simultaneously especially during peak hours to try and attain this target. MIAL scrapped simultaneous Cross-runway flight operations in mid-2013 after it found that single runway operations were more effective for increasing aircraft movements per hour. Runway 14/32 was henceforth to be used only when the main runway was unavailable due to maintenance or other reasons. The construction of new rapid exit taxiways helped in increasing flight handling capacity from 32 movements per hour to 44 in 2012. NATS delivered and helped MIAL implement a 'change roadmap' to help CSMIA achieve more than 50 movements per hour in 2015.
The increased air-side efficiencies resulted in CSMIA overtaking Gatwick Airport in March 2017 to become the world's busiest airport with only one operational runway at a time.

Runway notes

Once the longest commercial runway in India, Runway 09/27 is the airport's main runway. 13 taxiways, including four rapid exit taxiways, connect it to a full-length parallel taxiway to its north. It intersects the secondary runway south of the terminal buildings. The reconstruction of the runway started in September 2010 and was completed in May 2011.

Runway 14/32 has ten taxiways including three rapid exit taxiways that connect to a parallel taxiway running along its eastern flank. It runs between Terminals 1 and 2 and was reconstructed in 2010. The associated taxiways of secondary runway were upgraded in 2019. A new rapid exit taxiway and the conversion of taxiways to Code-F effectively increased the capacity of the runway. In 2020, the secondary runway set a record of 47 movements per hour during peak hour traffic as compared to 36 movements per hour.

Issues with utilising 14/32 are:

MIAL was considering constructing a second parallel runway as part of its master plan. However, the construction of this runway would necessitate a large-scale relocation of either Air India's hangars and maintenance facilities or the airport's flight kitchens and the Sahar police station, among others, depending on its alignment. The parallel runway remains an active part of the expansion plan but in the meantime the cross runway is being upgraded as much as possible.

Air traffic control tower

India's second tallest air traffic control tower with a height of  after Delhi Airport (101.9 m) stands in a section of the parking area opposite terminal 1B. The tower was inaugurated on 18 October 2013 and took over operations on 1 January 2014.

From the new tower, air traffic controllers are able to see  beyond the thresholds of both runways. The cost of the fully equipped tower is estimated at 4 billion.

The previous ATC tower, built by the Airports Authority of India (AAI) at an overall project cost of about ₹2.80 billion, was functional from 1999 to 2013. During that period, many airlines such as Singapore Airlines, Saudi, Qantas and United avoided landing at Mumbai airport when the secondary runway was in use as the ATC tower was too close to the runway and not in compliance with ICAO standards. The tower penetrated runway 14/32's transitional obstacle limitation surfaces by over 50 metres (for instrument approaches). The tower also obstructed the path of a parallel taxiway under construction for the secondary runway. MIAL demolished the tower in 2014.

Terminals
The airport has two terminals for scheduled commercial passenger services: Terminal 1 at Santacruz for domestic flights and Terminal 2 at Sahar for both international and domestic flights. While both terminals use the same airside facilities, they are physically separated on the cityside, requiring a 15–20-minute (landside) drive between them. A dedicated General Aviation Terminal caters to passengers using private and non-scheduled flight operations.

Currently operational terminals

Terminal 1
Terminal 1, locally known as Santacruz Airport, is used for domestic flights primarily operated by low-cost carriers. This was the original Santacruz building that was Mumbai's first passenger terminal which was once integrated, however was renamed Terminal 1 after the opening of the Sahar building for international operations and became a domestic operations terminal. It was refurbished several times over the decades, the most recent being during the 2000s. It was further divided into Terminal 1A, Terminal 1B, and Terminal 1C after their permanent closure during the course of late 1990s and early 2000s. It was used by SpiceJet, Go First, and IndiGo, but after Jet Airways dissolved on 17 April 2019, select flights from all the Terminal 1 airlines moved into the newer Terminal 2 building. The terminal has 11 passenger boarding bridges. MIAL renamed Terminal 1B to Terminal 1 in January 2017 to help fliers identify it easily. Several airlines operate airconditioned Cerita buses owned by BEST to ferry passengers between the terminal and aircraft.

Terminal 2

Larsen & Toubro (L&T) was awarded the contract to construct the new Terminal 2, in order to differentiate it from the Old Terminal 2 Building. Skidmore, Owings & Merrill (SOM) was the architectural designer of the project. SOM also provided the schematic design of structure and MEP and the detailed structural design of the roof. Detailed design of the foundations and the rest of the structure and civil works, the MEP, IT, and airport systems, including the full construction documentation of the project was carried out by L&T's in-house design team, EDRC (Engineering Design and Research Center). The terminal covers a land area of 210,000 square metres and has replaced the Previous International Terminal (which has already been demolished). The entire project was estimated to cost  and employ over 12,000 workers.
The X-shaped terminal has a total floor area of 450,000 square metres across four floors and handles both domestic and international passengers. It includes new taxiways and apron areas for aircraft parking designed to cater to 40 million passengers annually. The structure has boarding gates on two piers extending southwards from a central processing building featuring a 42-metre high roof employing over 20,000 metric tonnes of fabricated steel covering 30 acres. However, the eastern pier of Terminal 2 remains truncated due to non-clearance of slums in the adjoining plot, giving an asymmetrical look when seen from above. The new Terminal 2 building operates Multiple Aircraft Ramp System (MARS) stands and swing gates, so that a single stand can accommodate either one wide body aircraft or two narrow body aircraft, in either domestic or international configuration. The new terminal is connected by the six-lane Sahar Elevated Access Road to the Western Express Highway. A metro rail link to the terminal is under construction.

The New Terminal has around 21,000 square metres of retail space, lounges and travel services, over 5,000 square metres of landscaping and a multi level car park for 5,000 cars. The parking Management System and Revenue control system for the entire MLCP has been designed and supplied by SKIDATA. It has 192 check-in counters and 60 immigration counters for departing passengers, and 14 baggage carousels and 76 immigration counters for arriving passengers. To transfer passengers across its four levels, the building has 48 escalators and 75 elevators. The terminal also features 42 travelators.
In the initial phase of development, the apron adjoining Terminal 2 provides a total of 48 stands including 3 Code F stands (for the A380). In the final phase of development a total of 38 Code E/F contact stands, 14 Code E/F remote stands and 20 Code C remote stands are provided (total 72 stands).

The GVK Lounge, the first common luxury lounge at an airport in India, opened in November 2014. The lounge is open to First class and Business class travellers and can accommodate 440 guests at a time. It is spread over 30,000 square feet across two levels of the terminal and has a library, a business centre and fine-dining options, apart from the usual facilities like concierge services, smoking zone, food and beverage, bar, luxury spa, shower area and a relaxation area. The luxury lounge has won the 'World's Leading Airport Lounge – First Class 2015' award at the World Travel Awards 2015 held in Morocco.

The terminal also houses the Niranta Airport Transit Hotel and the 32-room hotel is the first of its kind in the country. It is located on Level 1 of the terminal and rooms may be booked by passengers who have checked into the airport. IWG plc, operating under the brand Regus operates a shared workspace out of the terminal.

The Old International Terminal was closed permanently at 13:00 on 12 February 2014, and international operations from the New Terminal  2 commenced from the same day. The first arrival was Air India flight 343 (an Airbus A330-200) from Singapore via Chennai, and the first departure was Jet Airways flight 118 (a Boeing 777-300ER) to London. It was inaugurated by the then Prime Minister of India Manmohan Singh. The domestic operations at Terminal 2 were launched on 9 January 2015, with the inaugural flight of Vistara arriving from New Delhi. Vistara initially operated from Level 4 of the Terminal, which is being used only by international passengers, but in July 2015, they shifted to Level 3, which will be used only for domestic operations. Air India shifted all of its domestic operations from Terminal 1A to Terminal 2 on 1 October 2015 making it the second airline to operate domestic flights from the Terminal 2, to ease their International and Domestic passenger transfers, and Jet Airways shifted all of its domestic operations from Terminal 1 to Terminal 2 on 15 March 2016, facilitating a seamless transfer experience for its passengers, whereas all other domestic airlines, namely Indigo, Go First, and SpiceJet, took place, both Departure and Arrival, at Terminal 1.

After the demise of Jet Airways on 17 April 2019, other carriers launched additional domestic flights using slots vacated by Jet Airways. These flights were operated from Terminal 2. This arrangement resulted in some of the larger carriers having to operate domestic flights from both terminals. Hence, MIAL moved to streamline operations at both terminals in September 2019, shifting all of its domestic operations of Indigo, AirAsia India and Go First back to Terminal 1, while SpiceJet shifted all of its domestic operations from Terminal 1 to Terminal 2.

The airport has free Wifi connectivity provided by Tata Docomo across both Terminal 1 and 2. However, the service has been criticized for being ineffective and complicated access for international passengers, as the passengers need to get an OTP through an Indian phone number only, while the free service lasts for just 45 minutes, following which passengers have to buy data packs. Despite the criticism, there has been no change in the wifi policy from the airport operators.

Car Parking and Passenger Arrivals
All vehicles arriving at Terminal 2 to pick up arriving passengers are routed via the Multi-Level Car Park and are charged a fee to counter traffic congestion at the airport.

General Aviation Terminal
CSIA's General Aviation Terminal for private and non-scheduled flight operators (NSOPs) is located at Kalina on the south-west side of the airfield. The terminal was approved for international operations in April 2011, making CSMIA the first airport in India to have a self-contained terminal for handling round the clock domestic and international flight operations for private and NSOPs. The terminal offers facilities for passengers departing and arriving on private aircraft and business jets. The terminal has two exclusive lounges, two conference halls, two crew restrooms and a café bar.

Previous terminals

Terminal 1 (Divided into 1A, 1B, and 1C)
When the Sahar terminal was opened in the 1980s, the terminal at Santacruz reverted to being a domestic terminal. The terminal consisted of three structures, Terminals 1A, 1B, and 1C.
 Terminal 1A - It was opened in April 1992, and was used solely by Indian Airlines (now Air India). In 2005, Kingfisher Airlines also began operating from 1A, after it entered into an agreement to source all ground handling and terminal space from Indian Airlines. In June 2013, shortly after Kingfisher ceased operations, MIAL allocated the vacant space to GoAir. From 1 October 2015, Air India moved all of its Terminal 1A operations to the new Terminal 2. GoAir moved its departure operations to Terminal 1B on that same date, resulting in the closure of the Terminal 1A departures level. GoAir, however, continued to use Terminal 1A's arrivals level until 15 March 2016 when its arrivals were also shifted to Terminal 1B and Terminal 1A was shut.
 Terminal 1B - This was the original Santacruz building that was Mumbai's first passenger terminal which was once integrated, however was renamed Terminal 1 after the opening of the Sahar building for international operations and became a domestic operations terminal.
 Terminal 1C - It was built at a cost of  3 billion and opened in April 2010. Architectural design was provided by Hafeez Contractor. EDRC, the in-house design unit of the EPC contractor Larsen & Toubro (L&T) performed the Structural, MEP and IT/Airport systems design. The terminal had six passenger boarding bridges and allowed connectivity between Terminals 1A and 1B. It was spread over 297,194 sq ft across three levels and had a seating capacity of about 900 passengers. Level 1 housed the offices of MIAL and some airlines, Level 2 comprised the security-hold area for passengers after checking in at either Terminal 1A or 1B. Level 3 accommodated a food court. The building served as a boarding-only facility for all airlines. Passengers entered this facility via Terminal 1B.

In January 2017, MIAL renamed the Terminal 1B as T1.

Terminal 2 (Divided into 2A, 2B, and 2C)

Terminal 2 of the airport is located at Sahar Village, in Vile Parle East. Designed by Aéroports de Paris and opened in January 1981, Terminal 2 was built in three modular phases as Terminals 2A, 2B, and 2C. Each module had a capacity of 2.5 million passengers.
The terminal structure was laid out in a space-saving vertical arrangement with separate levels for arrivals and departures. An overpass on the city-side took passengers to the upper level departure forecourt.

The original terminal was a convex shaped single concourse building with 14 Code E contact stands. The greater T2 apron also provided a further 15 Code D/E and 6 Code C remote stands. This gave a total of 35 stands on the existing apron.
The departures section of 2A had 42 check-in counters, 18 more than in the international section at the Santacruz terminal. After completing customs and immigration formalities, the departing travellers were led down to a mezzanine floor where five elongated nodules connect the terminal with the aircraft via aerobridges.

Its boarding gates 3 to 8 were the first aerobridges installed in the subcontinent. It was decommissioned and demolished in January 2009 to make way for the new T2 structure.
 Terminal 2B - It costed  and was completed in 1984. It served Air India and carriers handled by Air India between September 1986 and October 1999 and was decommissioned when Terminal 2C opened. It was extensively refurbished and made operational once again following the demolition of Terminal 2A.
 Terminal 2C - Inaugurated in October 1999, it was originally and exclusively for Air India, Air India Express and those carriers whose ground operations were handled by Air India.

Terminals 2B and 2C were decommissioned in February 2014 when the new T2 took over operations. They were demolished later that year, so that the remainder of the new T2 could be completed.

Cargo Complex
The Air Cargo Complex, located west of the international passenger Terminal 2, has been in operation since 1977. The cargo apron is capable of handling five wide-bodied aircraft. In 2009–10, the airport handled 385,937 metric tonnes of International Cargo and 165,252 metric tonnes of Domestic Cargo. Air India (AI) and Mumbai International Airport Pvt Ltd (MIAL) have been appointed as custodians of cargo by the Central Board of Excise and Customs at Mumbai. The Cargo Terminal has a Centre for Perishable Cargo (CPC) with an area of 1844 m2 for perishable and temperature sensitive international export shipments, strong rooms of 115 m2 for storage of valuable cargo and storage areas for dangerous goods in both import and export warehouses, dedicated Unaccompanied Baggage handling and clearance areas and 9 coloured X-ray cargo screening machines for export cargo.

Apart from handling 65% of the international volumes at CSIA, MIAL also operates a Common User Domestic Cargo Facility. After taking over the redevelopment work of the airport in 2006, MIAL commissioned an offshore Common User Terminal (CUT) near the Marol pipeline as a temporary arrangement. In June 2016, MIAL opened a new domestic cargo CUT near the Western Express Highway in Vile Parle.

The CUT has been outsourced to Concor Air Ltd. on a Build-operate-transfer basis. The terminal has the capacity to handle 300,000 metric tonnes of cargo annually and is built on an area of 60,000 square feet. The Cargo Terminal is an "elevated terminal structure" where all arriving domestic cargo is managed from the basement level while departing cargo is handled at the upper level. Air India and Blue Dart handle their own domestic cargo operations at their own terminals.
Blue Dart opened its dedicated cargo facility at Mumbai Airport near Terminal 1 on 7 February 2019. The facility measures 4,300 square meters and has air-side and city-side access, allowing for faster transfer of shipments.

Airlines and destinations

Passenger

Cargo

Statistics

Connectivity
 Vile Parle is a railway station on the Western line and Harbour line of the Mumbai Suburban Railway network closest to both T1 and T2 of the airport.
 Airport Road and Marol Naka are the stations on Line 1 of the Mumbai Metro system closest to Terminal T2.
 Western Express Highway (WEH) is the station on Line 1 of the Mumbai Metro system closest to Terminal T1.

The Brihanmumbai Electricity Supply and Transport Undertaking (BEST) operates air-conditioned buses to the Airport from Andheri railway station. The Navi Mumbai Municipal Transport (NMMT) runs bus services to the Airport from various nodes of Navi Mumbai.

Upcoming airport metro stations

Line 3 of the Mumbai Metro will run underground from Cuffe Parade to SEEPZ and serve CSMIA via three stations – one each at the Santacruz and Sahar terminals and one in the GVK SkyCity. It will reduce the commute time between Colaba and the airport to 40 minutes.

In early 2012, the MMRDA held talks with MIAL to either construct or finance the construction of three of the line's stations. MIAL agreed to bear the cost of constructing the three stations, expected to total  777 crore, because of the potential increase in passenger convenience. However, CSIA placed conditions before MMRDA for the corridor;
 The metro line should operate twenty-four hours a day in order to serve passengers of international flights scheduled at odd hours.
 A provision be made for a check-in facility at all metro stations.

MIAL specified that the commercial rights of the three stations it constructs will fully rest with the authority, and that revenue earned from any commercial activity on the premises would go to MIAL. It would undertake the design and civil construction of the stations, costing  600 crore, on its own, and would pay the estimated cost of electromechanical equipment (around  177 crore) to MMRDA in three equal instalments over three years.

The line will have an underground station at CSMIA.
Civil work on this line began in early 2020 and is to be completed by the end of 2023, until CSMIA.

The MMRDA has also planned Line 8 between CSMIA and the under-construction Navi Mumbai International Airport.

Awards
Along with Delhi Airport, the airport was adjudged the "World's Best Airport" at Airport Service Quality Awards 2017 in the highest category of airports handling more than 40 million passengers annually by Airports Council International. It has also won the "Best Airport in India and Central Asia" award at the Skytrax 2016 World Airport Awards. It is one of the three airports in India to have implemented Airport Collaborative Decision Making (A-CDM) to ensure timely takeoffs and landings. The airport was awarded as the Best Airport In the Asia-Pacific in 2020 (over 40 million passengers per annum) by Airports Council International. In March 2023, the airport was awarded again as the Best Airport in the Asia-Pacific in the category of over 40 million passengers per annum by Airports Council International.

Accidents and incidents

1940s
 On 12 July 1949,  Franeker , a Lockheed L-749-79-33 Constellation (registered PH-TDF) crashed into hills between Ghatkopar and Powai killing 33 passengers and 11 crew members. The victims included a large number of American journalists including Pulitzer Prize winner Hubert Renfro Knickerbocker. The blame was put on pilot error.

1950s
 On 19 July 1959, Rani of Aera, a Lockheed L-1049G Super Constellation (registered VT-DIN) carrying 46 people (39 passengers and 7 crew) approached Santacruz Airport in conditions of poor visibility due to rain. The captain was using an altimeter with the barometric pressure set at 29.92". The aircraft crashed and suffered damage beyond repair. There were no fatalities.

1960s
 On 28 July 1963, United Arab Airlines Flight 869 bound from Tokyo to Cairo, with a partial stop in Bombay, crashed into the Arabian Sea before approaching Santacruz Airport. All 63 people on board (55 passengers and 8 crew members) died, including 24 passengers from the Philippines who were due to travel to Greece to attend the 11th World Scout Jamboree.
 On 28 May 1968, Garuda Indonesian Airways Flight 892, a Convair 990A bound for Amsterdam but was on its next flight segment from Bombay to Karachi, crashed minutes after takeoff from Santacruz Airport. All 29 people on board (15 passengers and 14 crew members) died. In addition, there was also one casualty on the ground.

1970s
 On 12 October 1976: Indian Airlines Flight 171, a Sud Aviation SE 210 Caravelle had its right engine catch fire shortly after takeoff. The crew attempted to return, but the plane crashed approximately 1000 feet short of Runway 09. All six crew members and their 89 passengers were killed.
 On 1 January 1978: Air India Flight 855 a Boeing 747-237B crashed into the Arabian Sea after takeoff from Bombay, killing all on board (213 persons; 190 passengers, 23 crew).

1980s
 On 21 June 1982, Air India Flight 403, a Boeing 707–420 (registered VT-DJJ) carrying 99 passengers and 12 crew from Kuala Lumpur to Bombay via Madras crashed while landing at Sahar International Airport during a rainstorm. The fuselage broke apart and seventeen people including two crew members were killed.

1990s
 On 12 March 1993, during a series of bombings in Bombay, grenades were thrown at the terminal of the airport. There were no deaths. In addition, explosions went off in the Airport Hotel next to the airport.

2000s, 2010s and 2020s 
 On 4 September 2009, Air India Flight 829 a Boeing 747–437 flying on the Mumbai-Riyadh route caught fire at the Airport. The fire started in number one engine while the aircraft was taxiing to Runway 27 for take-off. An emergency evacuation was carried out with no injuries among the 228 people (213 passengers and 15 crew) on board.
 In December 2015, an Air India technician died in a freak accident after being sucked into the engine of an Airbus A320 during pushback. The plane, Air India Flight 619 was bound for Hyderabad. Although there were no casualties aboard the aircraft, The technician died after the co-pilot mistook a signal and started the engine.
 On 6 May 2021, a medical airplane carrying two crew, a doctor, a COVID-19 patient, and one of the patient's relatives performed a belly landing after losing a wheel earlier in the flight while departing from a refuelling stop. Airport firefighters sprayed foam onto the runway to prevent fire, and there were no injuries.

See also
 L&T Realty
 Larsen & Toubro
 List of airports in India
 List of the busiest airports in India
 Mumbai Port Trust
 Navi Mumbai International Airport

References

External links

 
 

Airports in Maharashtra
Airports in Mumbai
International airports in India
1942 establishments in India
Airports established in 1942
Monuments and memorials to Shivaji
World War II sites in India
Civilian airports with RAF origins
20th-century architecture in India